My Name Is Ai (stylized my name is AI) is the debut studio album by Japanese–American singer-songwriter Ai, released on November 2, 2001, by RCA Records and BMG Fun House.

Three singles were released from My Name Is Ai, "Cry, Just Cry", "U Can Do" and "Shining Star". Although the latter of the two did not chart, "Shining Star" charted and peaked at number 98 on the Oricon singles chart. 

Although not commercially successful, My Name Is Ai peaked at number 86 on the Oricon albums chart.

Background 
Ai developed an interest to become a singer in her early teens. After graduating from junior high school in Japan, Ai returned to her hometown, Los Angeles, California, to attend high school. Initially attending Glendale High School, Ai later switched to Los Angeles Count High School for the Arts, majoring in ballet. In 1998, she appeared as a dancer in Janet Jackson's song "Go Deep". 

In 1999, Ai joined an Asian girl group called SX4. While on holiday in Kagoshima, she performed Monica's "For You I Will", which led to her being scouted by BMG. Deciding to take the offer, Ai left SX4 and moved to Tokyo after graduating high school in 2000, signing to BMG Japan's RCA Records label.

Track listing

Notes 

 Tracks 2–4, 6, 10, 12, and 15–16 are stylized in all capitals.
 Track 14 is stylized as "Cry, just Cry"

Personnel 
Credits adapted from album's liner notes.

Musicians 

 Ai Carina Uemura – lead vocals, songwriting
 Takuya Harada – songwriting
 Shinnosukue – arrangement, songwriting, production
 Junkoo – arrangement, songwriting, production, piano
 Genki Hibino – songwriting
 Yukiko Mitsui – songwriting
 Ars Wizard C-VE – arrangement, songwriting, production
 Diggy-Mo – songwriting, vocals
 Takao Sugiyama – piano
 Masahiko Rokukawa – bass
 Ichiro Hada – guitar
 Kazu Minamisawa – guitar
 Kouyo Murakami – trombone
 Kazuo Kamata – sax
 Mikio Saito – trumpet
 To-Go – guitar
 Aogu – DJ
 Dave Fromm – background vocals
 Jun – background vocals
 Tsuyoshi – background vocals
 Peco – background vocals
 Masaaki Iwami – songwriting

Technical 

 Masaaki Iwami –mixing
 T. Takizawaa – mixing
 T. Kobayashi – mixing
 Don Katsumoto – sound production
 Ars Wizard CV-E – direction
 Junkoo – assistant direction
 Shinnosuke – assistant direction
 Yukihiro Yahagi – mastering

Visuals and imagery 

 Anthony Nishikawa – art direction
 Yoshihiro Sugawara – design
 Kazuya Morishima – photographer
 Ai Carina Uemura – photographer
 Rie Inada – hair, makeup
 Shuhei Yomo – styling
 Mika Itagaki – styling

Charts

Aftermath 
Following BMG selling its 50% share of Sony BMG in 2008 to the Sony Corporation of America, RCA's Japan division was rebranded as Ariola Japan. Subsequently, the ownership of the masters of My Name Is Ai was transferred to Sony Music Japan. Though physical copies are still manufactured by Sony Japan, the album was never formerly released to digital stores.

Release history

References 

2001 debut albums
Ai (singer) albums
Japanese-language albums
RCA Records albums